Epicrionops lativittatus, the eastern Peru caecilian, is a species of caecilian in the family Rhinatrematidae endemic to Peru. Its natural habitats are subtropical or tropical moist lowland forests, subtropical or tropical moist montane forests, and rivers.

References

Amphibians of Peru
Epicrionops
Amphibians described in 1968
Taxonomy articles created by Polbot